Kesselaid (also Kessulaid, or diminutively Kessu.) is a  Estonian islet located between the mainland and the island of Muhu in the Suur Strait (Big Strait) which connects the Väinameri strait and the Gulf of Riga. There's only one village on the island Kesse, which is administratively part of Muhu Parish, Saare County.

With the highest point 15.6 m above sea level it's the highest islet of Estonia. It is also considered to be the oldest islet, as it arose around 3000 BC.

Since 1938, the 7 to 8 feet high cliffs of Kesselaid have been designated a nature reserve.

Kesselaid had been inhabited by ethnic Estonians for centuries but heavy colonization by German settlers began in the 16th Century. In 1807 Kesselaid was sold to the Baltic German noble Jacob Friedrich von Helwig. By the end of the 1930s there were still 35 permanent residents on the island.

Today, in summer Kesselaid is partly used as pasture and grazing land for cattle and goats. It has also become an excursion destination for nature tourists. On the island, 16 species of orchids are counted.  From the island of Muhu, wild boar and elk occasionally swim to Kesselaid. 
 
A lighthouse was first built Kesselaid in 1885. The current, fully automated lighthouse dates to 1994.

Gallery

See also
List of islands of Estonia

References

External links

Eesti Saarte Kogu: Images of the Kesselaid and the Kesselaid Lighthouse

Estonian islands in the Baltic
Muhu Parish
Villages in Saare County